Chuu may refer to:

 Chūu or bardo, a Buddhist concept of "intermediate existence" between death and rebirth
 Chuu (One Piece) (also spelled "Choo"), character in the One Piece manga and anime series
 Chuu (singer), a South Korean singer and former member of girl group Loona
 Chuu (single album), by girl group Loona

See also
 Chu (disambiguation)
 Chiu (disambiguation)
 Choo (disambiguation)